Benjamin or Ben Hall may refer to:

 Ben Hall (baseball) (born 1983), American college baseball coach and former second baseman
 Benjamin Hall (industrialist) (1778–1817), Welsh entrepreneur
 Benjamin Hall, 1st Baron Llanover (1802–1867), British civil engineer and politician
 Ben Hall (bushranger) (1837–1865), Australian bushranger
 Ben Hall (TV series), 1975
 Ben Hall (actor) (1899–1985), American actor 
 Ben M. Hall (1921–1970), American writer
 Ben Hall (footballer, born 1879) (1879–1963), English football player, manager and trainer
 Ben Hall (footballer, born 1997), Northern Irish football player for Linfield
 Benjamin F. Hall (1814–1891), Chief Justice of the Colorado Territorial Supreme Court
 Ben L. Hall (fl. 2010s), American politician
 Benjamin Hall (athlete) (born 1984), Australian Paralympian
 Benjamin Hall (journalist) (born 1982), British journalist

See also
 Benn Hall, a venue in Rugby, Warwickshire, England
 Benedict Hall, known as Ben
 The Legend of Ben Hall, a 2016 Australian film about the bushranger